Nymphalini is a tribe of nymphalid brush-footed butterflies. Common names include admirals, anglewings, commas, and tortoiseshells, but none of these is specific to one particular genus.

The name anglewing butterflies is an English translation of a Latin term papiliones angulati, [Denis & Schiffermüller], ([1775, 1776]). Based on an overall similarity in the angulate wing shape, a collective name: Papiliones angulati was employed for Papilio atalanta, P. antiopa, P. cardui, P. c-album, P. io, P. polychloros, P. urticae, P. xanthomelas, P. vaualbum, P. levana and P. prorsa. The term papiliones angulati is applied as a collective taxon name, which therefore needs no type species as specified in Article 42.3.1 of the International Code of Zoological Nomenclature.  Papiliones angulati has thus been re-defined to apply only to a clade: Nymphalis sensu lato, and to specifically exclude Papilio atalanta [→ Vanessa], P. cardui [→ Cynthia], P. levana, and P. prorsa [→ Araschnia].

This monophyletic group of nymphaline butterflies inhabiting the Northern Hemisphere are characterized by a jagged outline of their wings and the ability to survive the winter months as adults in an obligatory hibernal diapause, hiding in various shelters (e.g., crevices, hollows, cavities, even unheated buildings). The signature mark of all butterflies is the cryptic colour and maculation (spots) of the ventral (under) side of their wings, serving to conceal the hibernating butterfly against the substrate on which it rests.

Genera
Listed alphabetically:

 Aglais Dalman, 1816 – tortoiseshells
 Antanartia Rothschild & Jordan, 1903 – African red admirals
 Araschnia Hübner, 1819
 Hypanartia Hübner, 1821 – mapwings
 Inachis – European peacock (now in Aglais)
 Kaniska Moore, 1899 – blue admiral (often in Polygonia)
 Mynes Boisduval, 1832
 Nymphalis Kluk, 1781 – anglewings, tortoiseshells
 Polygonia Hübner, 1819 – anglewings, commas
 Symbrenthia Hübner, 1819 – jesters
 Vanessa Fabricius, 1807 – red admirals, Kamehameha butterflies, painted ladies

The monotypic genus Tigridia is sometimes placed here as a very basal offshoot close to Colobura, sometimes in the related tribe Coeini.

Prehistoric genera only known from fossils are:
 †Jupitella Carpenter, 1985
 †Mylothrites Scudder, 1875

References

Korshunov, 1995. [Butterflies of the Asian part of Russia. A handbook] Dnevnye babochki Aziatskoi chasti Rossii. Spravochnik.:202 pp. (re: Roddia)
Kudrna, O. & J. Belicek, 2005. The Wiener Verzeichnis, its authorship, publication date and some names proposed for butterflies therein. Oedippus 23: 1-32. (re: Schiffermüller names)
Linnaeus, C. 1758. Systema Naturae per Regna Tria Naturae, Secundum Clases, Ordines, Genera, Species, cum Characteribus, Differentiis, Symonymis, Locis. Tomis I. 10th Edition Syst. Nat. (Edn 10). (re: N. antiopa, P. c-album, P. c-aureum, I. io, N. polychloros, A. urticae)

 
Nymphalinae
Taxa named by Constantine Samuel Rafinesque
Butterfly tribes